Endre Salgó (11 December 1913 – 1945) was a Hungarian field handball player who competed in the 1936 Summer Olympics.

He was born  and died in Budapest.

Salgó was part of the Hungarian field handball team, which finished fourth in the Olympic tournament. He played three matches.

References
sports-reference profile
profile 

1913 births
1945 deaths
Field handball players at the 1936 Summer Olympics
Hungarian male handball players
Olympic handball players of Hungary
Handball players from Budapest